Henry White, 1st Baron Annaly (1791 – 3 September 1873), was an Irish British Army soldier and politician.

Biography

Annaly was the son of Luke White, who had made a large fortune as a bookseller and lottery operator in Dublin. His mother was Elizabeth, daughter of Peter de la Mazière.

He purchased a Cornetcy in the 14th Light Dragoons in 1811 and served in the Peninsular War, fighting at the Siege of Badajoz and at the Battle of Salamanca. He purchased a Lieutenancy in 1812. In 1823 he was elected to the House of Commons for County Dublin, a seat he held until 1832, and also represented County Longford from 1837 to 1847 and again from 1857 to 1861. Between 1841 and 1873 Annaly served as Lord Lieutenant of County Longford. In 1863 he was raised to the peerage as Baron Annaly, of Annaly and Rathcline in the County of Longford.

Lord Annaly married Ellen (d. 12 May 1868), daughter of William Soper Dempster, on 3 October 1828. They had eight children:
Luke White, 2nd Baron Annaly
Capt. Henry White (4 September 1830 – 1860)
Eleanor Eliza White (d. 29 April 1907), married on 10 June 1854 Lt-Col. Henry Holden and had issue
George Frederick White (1 October 1831 – 1846)
Francis Samuel White (17 March 1836 – April 1855)
Charles William White (1838–1890)
Emily Beaujolais White (4 January 1844 – 18 December 1923), married on 20 July 1867 Robert Grosvenor, 2nd Baron Ebury, and had issue
Robert White (8 December 1844 – 3 March 1866)

Lord Annaly survived his wife by five years and died on 3 September 1873 at (demolished) Sunbury Park House, Sunbury on Thames. He was succeeded in the barony by his eldest son Luke.

Notes

References
Kidd, Charles, Williamson, David (editors). Debrett's Peerage and Baronetage (1990 edition). New York: St Martin's Press, 1990,

External links 
 

1791 births
1873 deaths
19th-century Irish people
14th King's Hussars officers
British Army personnel of the Napoleonic Wars
Lord-Lieutenants of Longford
Members of the Parliament of the United Kingdom for County Dublin constituencies (1801–1922)
White, Henry
White, Henry
White, Henry
White, Henry
White, Henry
White, Henry
White, Henry
White, Henry
White, Henry
UK MPs who were granted peerages
Peers of the United Kingdom created by Queen Victoria
Henry